Christina Alma Elisabeth Enroth-Cugell (1919 – June 15, 2016), was a vision scientist who was a professor at Northwestern University for 31 years, was a founding faculty member and one of the first women to teach at the McCormick School of Engineering and chaired the Department of Neurobiology at the Weinberg College of Arts and Sciences from 1984 to 1986.  Her husband David Cugell was a professor at the Feinberg School of Medicine for 58 years, the longest tenure in the school’s history.

Enroth-Cugell was born in Helsinki, Finland. She earned a joint M.D./Ph.D. from the Karolinska Institute in Sweden and did post-doctorate work at Harvard University. Enroth-Cugell was one of the first female interns at Passavant Memorial Hospital.

Her research focused on visual adaptation and the spatial and temporal aspects of receptive fields and the physiology of the mammalian retina.  One of her journal articles, based on a study with collaborator John G. Robson, has been cited approximately 2,000 times and "was one of the first to use systems analysis methods in vision, and it launched a field of study on parallel pathways in the visual system."

Awards and honors
Jonas Stein Friedenwald Award, 1983

References

1919 births
2016 deaths
Scientists from Helsinki
Karolinska Institute alumni
Women vision scientists
Northwestern University faculty